Lawrence Subrata Howlader, C.S.C. (born 11 September 1965) is a Bangladeshi prelate of the Catholic Church who has been the bishop of the Barisal, Bangladesh, since 2016. From 2009 to 2016 he was auxiliary bishop of Chittagong, officially known as Chattogram since 2018, where he was appointed archbishop in February 2021.

Education 
Lawrence completed his schooling from Barisal and Gournadi. He acquired Bachelor of Arts degree from Government Brojomohun College, Barisal and holds Licentiate in Depth Psychology, Spirituality & Counseling from Gregorian University, Rome.

Priesthood 
He joined the Congregation of the Holy Cross in 1987 and took his final vows on 6 August 1993. He was ordained a priest on 31 December 2004.

Episcopate 
On 7 May 2009, Pope Benedict XVI appointed him titular bishop of Afufenia and auxiliary bishop of Chittagong. He received his episcopal consecration on 3 July 2009.

On 29 December 2015, Pope Francis appointed Howlader the first bishop of Barisal. He was installed in his new diocese on 29 January 2016.

On 19 February 2021, Pope Francis appointed him archbishop of Chattogram.

References

Living people
1965 births
21st-century Roman Catholic bishops in Bangladesh
Congregation of Holy Cross bishops
People from Barisal District
Pontifical Gregorian University alumni
Notre Dame College, Dhaka alumni
Roman Catholic bishops of Barisal
Roman Catholic bishops of Chittagong
Roman Catholic archbishops of Chittagong